Kateregga Kamegere was Kabaka of the Kingdom of Buganda between 1644 and 1674. He was the fourteenth (14th) Kabaka of Buganda.

Claim to the throne
He was the only son of Kabaka Sekamaanya Kisolo, Kabaka of Buganda, who reigned between 1614 and 1634. His mother was Nabakyaala Nabuuso, the Naabagareka, his father's only wife. He ascended to the throne following the death of his stepfather, allegedly, after killing him by witchcraft around 1644. 

During the reign of Kimbugwe, Prince Kateregga had twin sons. Whilst performing the birth ceremonies in the presence of the Kabaka, Kateregga was accompanied by a different wife instead of the mother of the twins, because the latter was lame. Kimbugwe's inquiry about the absence of the twins' mother angered Kateregga, who stormed out midway through the ceremony. Kateregga declared war on Kabaka Kimbugwe, in which he usurped the throne from his cousin.

His reign

He established his capital at Lugeye Hill.

Kateregga is noted for his violent character, and the persecutions he carried out against the Ngo (leopard) clan for their claims to have royal links. Members of the clan found themselves migrating, joining other clans or founding separate clans in order to hide their identity. 

To Buganda's territory, Kateregga added Butambala and Gomba through conquest. He installed his own chiefs in these regions as well is in south Singo. His appointment of royal favourites to administrative positions in the provinces reflects a move away from the indirect rule of clan heads and hereditary chiefs towards more direct rule by the monarchy.

Married life
He married nine (9) wives:

 Nakabugo, daughter of Mugema, of the Nkima clan
 Nakamu, daughter of Kinyolo, of the Nkima clan
 Nakinyago, daughter of Naserenga, of the Ffumbe clan
 Naalongo Kawenyera, sister of Nakabugo, and daughter of Mugema, of the Nkima clan
 Naluggwa, daughter of Lwoomwa, of the Ndiga clan
 Namayumba, daughter of Mugema, of the Nkima clan
 Namugayi, daughter of Mpinga, of the Lugave clan
 Namutebi, daughter of Mbaja, of the Mamba clan.
 Nanzigu, daughter of Sekayiba, of the Mbogo clan.

Issue
He fathered fifteen (15) children:

 Prince (Omulangira) Lumansi Kijojo, whose mother was Nakabugo
 Prince (Omulangira) Naluwembe, whose mother was Nakamu
 Prince (Omulangira) Kinyago, whose mother was Nakinyago
 Prince (Omulangira) Wasswa Sseninde, whose mother was  Naalongo Kawenyera. (Born before 1644 with twin brother Kato)
 Prince (Omulangira) Kato Geserwa, whose mother was Naalongo Kawenyera. (Born before 1644 with twin brother Waswa)
 Prince (Omulangira) Senninde, whose mother was Naluggwa
 Prince (Omulangira) Gaweserwa, whose mother was Naluggwa
 Prince (Omulangira) Kawuuwa, whose mother was Namayumba
 Prince (Omulangira) Kawagga, whose mother was Namugayi
 Prince (Omulangira) Kazibwe Katakessu, whose mother was Namugayi
 Kabaka Mutebi I, Kabaka of Buganda from 1674 until 1680, whose mother was Namutebi
 Kabaka Juuko Mulwaana, Kabaka of Buganda, between 1680 and 1690, whose mother was Namutebi
 Kabaka Kayemba Kisiki, Kabaka of Buganda, between 1690 and 1704, whose mother was Namutebi
 Prince (Omulangira) Nzigu, whose mother was Nanzigu
 Princess (Omumbejja) Nazibanja, whose mother was Naluggwa.

The final years
He died from a millipede sting to his genitals in 1674. He was buried at Mitw'ebiri. Other credible sources put his burial place at Buteregga, Busiro.

Succession table

See also
 Kabaka of Buganda

References

External links
List of the Kings of Buganda

Kabakas of Buganda
17th-century African people